The 1986 Tennents' Sixes was the third staging of the indoor 6-a-side football tournament. This time it was held at the Scottish Exhibition and Conference Centre (SECC) in Glasgow on 19 and 20 January and shown on BBC Scotland.

There were 2 groups of 5,  with teams from the 1985–86 Scottish Premier Division season, except Celtic and Rangers. First Division club Dumbarton and English club Manchester City replaced them.

The two group winners and runners-up qualified to the semi-finals and Aberdeen beat St Mirren 3–0 in the final.

Group stage

Group 1

Group 2

Semi-finals

Final

References

External links
Scottish Football Historical Archive

1985–86 in Scottish football
1980s in Glasgow
Tennents' Sixes
Sports competitions in Glasgow
Football in Glasgow
January 1986 sports events in the United Kingdom